The Whole Shebang may refer to:

 The Whole Shebang (film), a 2001 romantic comedy film
 The Whole Shebang: A State-of-the-Universe(s) Report, a book by Timothy Ferris
 The Whole SHeBANG, a 1999 album by country music trio SHeDAISY
 The Whole Shebang (album), a 2005 album by Tennessee band Fluid Ounces
 The Shebang, a radio program previously known as The Whole Shebang

See also
 Shebang (disambiguation)